Saquan Hampton (born December 12, 1995) is an American football safety for the New Orleans Breakers of the United States Football League (USFL). He played college football at Rutgers.

Early years 
Raised in Hamilton Township, Mercer County, New Jersey, Hampton attended Nottingham High School, where he was named New Jersey First Team All-Group IV, First Team All-South Jersey, and First Team All-Colonial Valley Conference honors after registering 17 tackles, 4 interceptions, averaging more than 38 yards per kickoff return, 13 yards per punt return on defense his senior season.  He was named the Delaware Valley's Player of the Year by the 12th Man Touchdown Club Dinner.  He was a key member of the school's Central Jersey Group III championship as a junior.

Rivals rated Hampton, a consensus three-star recruit, its 23rd-best prospect.  He committed to Rutgers on National Signing Day in 2014 citing his desire to stay close to home.

College career 
Hampton attended Rutgers University, where he majored in labor and employment relations. In 2018, Hampton tied for the Big Ten Conference lead in passes defended by safeties, including three interceptions, two of which came in week 9 against Wisconsin.  Combined with his ten tackles that game, he was named Reese's Senior Bowl Defensive Player of the Week. Senior Bowl Executive Director Jim Nagy pointed out:"The first thing that will catch scouts’ attention is that Hampton has a background at cornerback, which is important in the sense that he has more experience in man coverage, even if it’s just at the high school level, than most safety prospects.

The attribute that showed up most in the game against the Badgers was his ball skills.  During our tape study, we liked him the most when the ball was in the air. On both his two picks last Saturday, one when he drove on an out route and another where he undercut a corner route, Hampton looked really natural playing the ball.  

The other aspect of Hampton’s game that stood out last week was his deep field instincts.  Scouts determine where to project safeties, either free or strong, based on where they look most natural playing and Hampton looks most comfortable in the middle of the field.  Some guys have a feel for routes and Hampton consistently put himself in the position to make plays."On November 27, 2018, Hampton was named unanimous All-Big Ten Honorable Mention by coaches and media. He was awarded the 2018 Homer Hazel Award as Rutgers' team MVP.

Professional career
In the lead-up to the 2019 NFL Draft, Hampton accepted an invitation to the East-West Shrine Game.  He was also invited to participate in the 2019 NFL Draft Combine.

Following the week of the Shrine Game, Bleacher Report's Matt Miller included Hampton among the "2019 NFL Draft's Biggest Winners from NFLPA Bowl, Shrine Game Weeks," noting, "He's a hitter with a fierce mentality and has the athleticism and size to become an NFL contributor."

New Orleans Saints
Hampton was drafted by the New Orleans Saints in the sixth round (177th overall) of the 2019 NFL Draft. He played in five games before being placed on injured reserve on December 17, 2019.

Hampton was waived/injured by the Saints during final roster cuts on September 5, 2020, and subsequently reverted to the team's injured reserve list the next day. He was waived with an injury settlement on September 14.

New York Jets
On November 3, 2020, Hampton was signed to the New York Jets practice squad. He was promoted to the active roster on December 12, 2020. On December 16, 2020, Hampton was placed on injured reserve. He was waived with a failed physical designation on May 7, 2021, and reverted to the team's reserve/physically unable to perform list on May 10. He was released on September 28.

Edmonton Elks
Hampton signed with the Edmonton Elks of the CFL on April 15, 2022. He was released on May 14.

New Orleans Breakers
On February 11, 2023, Hampton signed with the New Orleans Breakers of the United States Football League (USFL).

References

External links 
 Rutgers profile

1995 births
Living people
People from Hamilton Township, Mercer County, New Jersey
Sportspeople from Mercer County, New Jersey
Players of American football from New Jersey
American football safeties
Rutgers Scarlet Knights football players
New Orleans Saints players
New York Jets players
Edmonton Elks players
New Orleans Breakers (2022) players